Othmane Boussaid (born 7 March 2000) is a Belgian professional footballer who plays as an attacking midfielder or winger for FC Utrecht. He is also the youngest player that debuted in the Proximus League vs OHL and scored his first goal.

Personal life
Born in Belgium, Boussaid is of Moroccan descent.

References

External links
 
 
 Career stats & Profile - Voetbal International

2000 births
Living people
Sportspeople from Kortrijk
Footballers from West Flanders
Belgian sportspeople of Moroccan descent
Association football midfielders
Belgian footballers
Belgium youth international footballers
Belgium under-21 international footballers
Belgian Pro League players
Eredivisie players
Eerste Divisie players
Lierse S.K. players
FC Utrecht players
NAC Breda players
Belgian expatriate footballers
Belgian expatriate sportspeople in the Netherlands
Expatriate footballers in the Netherlands